José Francisco García Cruz  (born August 12, 1993) is a Mexican luchador, or professional wrestler, who works under the ring name Chamuel. He currently works for the Mexican Consejo Mundial de Lucha Libre (CMLL) promotion where he portrays a heel (known as a rudo in lucha libre, the antagonists of professional wrestling). He is one of the competitors in CMLL's Micro-Estrella ("Micro-Star") division where he competes with and against other wrestlers with dwarfism. His ring name is based on Camael, the archangel of strength, courage, and war from Christian and Jewish mythology.

From his début in 2012 until 2017, he worked primarily on the Mexican independent circuit as a mascota and with occasional tag team partner Henry, portraying an "evil doll" in the style of Chucky. In 2017 he joined CMLL and in 2019, as part of the CMLL 86th Anniversary Show, he lost his mask to Microman. He is the first holder of the CMLL World Micro-Estrella Championship.

Professional wrestling career
Chamuel made his professional wrestling début in 2010, as the tag team partner of regular-sized wrestler Henry. The two portrayed a masked, monster/doll duo with Chamuel initially wearing a mask that resembling a ventriloquist's dummy, but would later change to an evil clown mask. In his first recorded match, Chamuel and Henry teamed up with Monsther and Chucky to defeat Gran Alebrije, Pequeño Cuije, Don Pollo, and Pollito. By 2012 Chamuel regularly worked for the local promotion in Pachuca, Hidalgo. On February 21 he beat Chucky in a Lucha de Apuestas, mask vs. mask match to win the evil doll mask. Two months later he won the mask of Gallito Feliz on another local show. In July he was one of eight men risking their mask on the outcome of a steel cage match but was not involved in the final portion of the match, having escaped earlier on. In October 2012 Chamuel won the hair of El Loquito in a three-way match that also included Mostruolin. Chamuel ended 2012 by surviving another steel cage match with his mask, watching as The Medic's II was unmasked at the end of the match.

Consejo Mundial de Lucha Libre (2017–present)
In mid-2017 Chamuel was hired by Consejo Mundial de Lucha Libre (CMLL) to be part of their newly created "Micro-Estrellas" (Micro Stars) division. In his début, Chamuel teamed up with Mije, only to lose to Microman and El Gallito. For the first anniversary of the Micro-Estrellas division, CMLL held an eight-micros torneo cibernetico elimination match, featuring the entire active Micro-Estrella division at the time. Chamuel teamed up with Angelito, El Gallito and Mije to take on Microman, Atomo, Guapito, and Zacarías el Perico. In the end, Microman pinned Chamuel to win the tournament. 

Following the anniversary, Microman and Chamuel began a long-running storyline feud, which often saw Chamuel either tear Microman's mask open or steal it during a match. The Micro-Estrellas made their début at a major CMLL show on November 11, 2018, when Microman, Atomo, and Gallito defeated Chamuel, Mije, and Zacarías two falls to one on the Día de Muertos show. The Microman/Chamuel feud led to the first one-on-one match in the Micro division on August 30, 2019, as part of CMLL's International Gran Prix. The match ended in a disqualification as Chamuel was disqualified for throwing his mask to Microman in an attempt to deceive the referee. The feud between the two led to a Lucha de Apuestas, mask vs. mask match, as part of the CMLL 86th Anniversary Show. The match was the first time in 32 years that two "Micros" had a Lucha de Apuestas match. Microman won the third and deciding fall, forcing Chamuel to unmask and reveal his real name per lucha libre traditions. On December 25, 2019 Chamuel outlasted Microman, El Gallito, Guapito, Zacarías, and Átomo in a torneo cibernetico elimination match to win the newly created CMLL World Micro-Estrella Championship, lastly eliminating Microman. He lost the title on October 30, 2022 against Micro Gemelo Diablo I.

Independent circuit (2017–present)
While working for CMLL, Chamuel, like all CMLL wrestlers, is allowed to take independent circuit bookings on days he is not needed by the company. Chamuel's independent circuit appearances usually sees him team with, and face off against, other CMLL Micro-Estrellas. On September 15, 2018, Microman, and Gallito defeated Chamuel and Zacarías in a match at the Benito Juarez ExpoMuseo in Mexico City. The Micro-Estrellas also made a special appearance for The Crash Lucha Libre, one of Mexico's largest independent promotions, with Microman and Gallito once again defeating Chamuel and Zacarías in their March 2, 2019 match.

Reception
While the CMLL 86th Anniversary Show, in general, was given mediocre reviews the match between Micro Man and Chamuel was well received. Richard Gallegos of the Voices of Wrestling stated that "Microman and Chamuel saved the night with their fantastic Apuestas Match", and a Cage Side Seats review named it the "match of the night".

Championships and accomplishments
Consejo Mundial de Lucha Libre
CMLL World Micro-Estrella Championship (1 time)

Luchas de Apuestas record

References

1993 births
Living people
Micro-Estrella wrestlers
Mexican male professional wrestlers
Masked wrestlers
Professional wrestlers from Puebla